Anna Tatishvili and Coco Vandeweghe were the defending champions, but Vandeweghe chose not to participate. Tatishvili partnered Marina Melnikova but lost in the first round to Alexa Glatch and Bernarda Pera.

Verónica Cepede Royg and Mariana Duque won the title, defeating Alexa Glatch and Bernarda Pera in the final, 6–0, 6–3.

Seeds

Draw

References 
 Draw

John Newcombe Women's Pro Challenge - Doubles